St. Gerard Catholic High School was a private Catholic high school in San Antonio, Texas.  It is located in the Roman Catholic Archdiocese of San Antonio. St. Gerard was established in 1927 and closed in 2022.

College dual credit
Ninety-one percent of graduates went on to college, with many seniors taking Educational and Technical courses for dual credit at St. Philips College.

St. Gerard juniors and seniors were eligible to participate in St. Philip College dual credit program; as well as its Southwest Campus Academies, Information Technology and Security Academy, Alamo Area Aerospace Academy, and Manufacturing Technology Academy.

Extra-curricular athletics and clubs

The school offered athletic opportunities for all students. Boys participated in football, basketball, baseball, and tennis. Girl’s athletics included volleyball, basketball, softball, and tennis. The Royals competed in the Texas Association of Private and Parochial Schools (TAPPS).

Organizations included: 
 National Honor Society
 Cheerleaders
 Student Council
 Mu Alpha Theta
 Royal Ambassadors
 Dance Team
 
The Royal Ambassadors were students who represented St. Gerard at various events both on and off campus, showing their “Royal Pride” to all whom they meet. Royal Ambassadors visited other Catholic schools on recruitment days, offered tours to new and prospective students, and assisted where needed, as per directions from the principal.

Royal Ambassadors were required to maintain a 3.0 GPA, have faculty recommendations, and submit an application and letter of interest to the principal.

The following State Championships (TCIL) were won at St. Gerard:

Religious staff

Notes and references

External links
 School Website

Catholic secondary schools in Texas
Educational institutions established in 1927
High schools in San Antonio
1927 establishments in Texas
Defunct Catholic schools in the United States
Defunct schools in Texas